Fricka may refer to:

Mythology
 an alternative name for the mythological goddess Frigg
 an alternative name for the mythological goddess Freija
 (see also Frigg and Freyja origin hypothesis)

Opera
 A character in the Ring cycle of Richard Wagner; the goddess of marriage, herself married to the chief of the Gods, Wotan

Children's fiction
Central character of a 1951–1955 series of books by M.E. Atkinson